Armando Izzo (born 2 March 1992) is an Italian professional footballer who plays as a centre-back for  club Monza, on loan from Torino. He has represented the Italy national football team.

Club career

Early career 
Izzo started playing football at the age of 13 with ARCI Scampia, before moving Napoli, where he also won a Campionato Nazionale Dante Berretti. In the 2011–12 season he went on loan to Triestina in Lega Pro Prima Divisione, with whom he played 13 games and scored his first professional career goal.

On 31 January 2012, Izzo joined Avellino in a co-ownership deal, with whom he played 6 games. The following season, Izzo made 22 appearances and scored a goal, as Avellino won the league and were promoted to Serie B. Izzo debuted in Serie B in the 2013–14 season, ending the season with a goal in 30 appearances.

Genoa 
During the summer he was sold to Genoa, with whom he debuted in Serie A on 5 October 2014, in a 2–1 win away against Parma. He scored his first goal in the top flight on 11 January 2015, at San Siro against Inter Milan. On 1 April 2015, he renewed his contract with Genoa until 2019. Izzo ended the season with 20 appearances and one goal.

The following season makes his first league appearance of the season in a 2–0 win against Verona. He made 33 appearances for Genoa during the season.

In the 2016–17 he was a starter in defence for the Ligurian team, while the following season, he made only 16 appearances due to injuries and disqualifications. He scored his only goal of the season on 25 October 2017, opening the scoring in 2–3 home defeat against Napoli. On 12 May 2018, in an away game against Benevento, he made his hundredth appearance for Genoa.

Torino 
On 4 July 2018, Izzo signed a four-year contract with Torino. He made his debut with Torino on 12 August during a 4–0 win over against Cosenza in the Coppa Italia. On 4 November he scored his first goal in Serie A with Torino, in 1–4 away victory against Sampdoria.

Loan to Monza 
On 1 September 2022, Izzo joined newly-promoted Serie A side Monza on a one-year loan. He made his debut on 5 September, as a second-half substitute in a 2–0 league defeat to Atalanta.

International career 
On 5 November 2016, Izzo was called up to the senior squad for the first time by Gian Piero Ventura for Italy's 2018 FIFA World Cup Qualification match against Liechtenstein and a friendly match against Germany.

On 15 March 2019, Izzo received a call up from Roberto Mancini for Italy's UEFA Euro 2020 qualifying matches against Finland and Liechtenstein later that month. On 26 March, he made his senior international debut in a 6–0 home win over Liechtenstein.

Match-fixing 
On 23 May 2016, Izzo, along with midfielders Luca Pini and Francesco Millesi, was put under investigation by the anti-mafia police department in Naples (DDA) after being accused of being directly involved with a Camorra clan based in Secondigliano in altering the results of the Serie B matches Modena–Avellino (1–0) from 17 March 2014, and Avellino–Reggina (3–0) from 25 May 2014. On 3 March 2017, the Italian Football Federation's prosecutor asked for Izzo to be suspended for six years, also requesting that collateral estoppel be applied, and demanded that he should receive a €20,000 fine. On 12 April, he received an 18-month ban from football and was also fined €50,000. On 19 May, his ban was reduced to six months.

Style of play 
Izzo is a right-footed defender who mainly plays as a centre-back. He has often played in a three-man back-line throughout his career, a position which best utilises his dynamism, and which also allows him to contribute offensively as well as defensively. He has also been deployed as a right-sided full-back on occasion. A strong, hard-working, and tenacious defender, he is known for his tackling ability and anticipation.

Career statistics

Club

International

Honours 
Avellino
 Lega Pro Prima Divisione: 2012–13
 Supercoppa di Lega Pro Prima Divisione: 2013

References

External links 
 

1992 births
Living people
Footballers from Naples
Association football central defenders
Italian footballers
S.S.C. Napoli players
U.S. Triestina Calcio 1918 players
U.S. Avellino 1912 players
Genoa C.F.C. players
Torino F.C. players
A.C. Monza players
Serie C players
Serie B players
Serie A players
Italy international footballers